Edwin Smith (1822April 27, 1906) was an American dealer and collector of antiquities who gave his name to an Ancient Egyptian medical papyrus, the Edwin Smith Papyrus.

Biography
Smith was born in Bridgeport, Connecticut, and lived in Egypt during the latter half of the 19th century.  In 1862 he came temporarily into possession of a medical papyrus which was sold by its Egyptian owner to Georg Ebers in 1873 and published by Ebers in 1875.  It was thus best known as the Ebers Papyrus.

In 1862 he also purchased the papyrus which came to bear his name, from a dealer called Mustapha Aga at Luxor. Smith's knowledge of hieratic was not sufficient to enable him to translate the papyrus, a task which was undertaken by James Henry Breasted, aided by Arno B. Luckhardt, a professor of physiology, and led to the publication of the translation in 1930.

Edwin Smith died in 1906.

Footnotes

References
Marshall Clagett, Ancient Egyptian Science: A Source Book, vol. II, Calendars, Clocks, and Astronomy, 1995, . 
James Henry Breasted (editor), The Edwin Smith Surgical Papyrus: Hieroglyphic Transliteration, Translation and Commentary, 1922, New-York Historical Society. Republished in three volumes in 1930 by University of Chicago Press: Volume I; Volume II; and Volume III.

American Egyptologists
1822 births
1906 deaths
People from Bridgeport, Connecticut